Moldova is set to participate in the Eurovision Song Contest 2023 in Liverpool, United Kingdom, with "" written by Pavel Parfeni, Andrei Vulpe and Iuliana Parfeni. The song will be performed by Pasha Parfeny, who previously represented Moldova in 2012. The Moldovan broadcaster, TeleRadio-Moldova (TRM), organised the national final  2023 in order to select the Moldovan entry for the 2023 contest, with a combination of jury votes and public voting determining the winning entry.

Background

Prior to the 2023 contest, Moldova had participated in the Eurovision Song Contest 17 times since its first entry in 2005.

The Moldovan national broadcaster, TeleRadio-Moldova (TRM), broadcasts the event within Moldova and organises the selection process for the nation's entry. TRM confirmed its intention to participate at the 2023 Eurovision Song Contest on 20 October 2022. Moldova has selected their entry via a national selection show between 2008 and 2020, while their entry in 2021 was selected via an internal selection. A selection show was to be held on 5 March 2022 to select Moldova's entry for the 2022 contest, but on 28 January 2022 it was revealed the entry would be selected during the auditions following the cancellation of the final due to COVID-19 restrictions. On 23 December 2022, TRM announced that it would hold a national final to select its entry for the 2023 contest.

Before Eurovision

Etapa națională 2023 
 2023 was the national final format developed by TRM in order to select Moldova's entry for the Eurovision Song Contest 2023. The event took place at the TRM Studio 2 in Chișinău, hosted by Doina Stimpovschi, Ion Jalbă and Daniela Crudu, and included a final held on 4 March 2023. The show was broadcast on Moldova 1 and OUTtv as well as online via TRM's official website trm.md and Eurovision Song Contest website eurovision.md as well as the broadcaster's Facebook and YouTube pages.

Competing entries 
Artists and composers had the opportunity to submit their entries between 23 December 2022 and 16 January 2023. Artists could submit more than one song, and an international act was able to compete only if they are part of a duo or group where 50% of the lead vocalists are of Moldovan nationality. At the conclusion of the submission deadline, 33 valid entries were received by the broadcaster. The live audition round took place on 28 January 2023 at TRM Studio 2 in Chișinău where 10 finalists were selected to advance. The auditions were broadcast on Moldova 2 as well as online via trm.md, eurovision.md and via TRM's Facebook and YouTube pages. The jury panel that evaluated the songs during the live auditions and selected the 10 finalists consisted of Violeta Julea (performer), Ion Chiorpec (head of Radio Moldova Muzical), Vasile Advahov (musician), Liviu Știrbu (composer) and Daniela Crudu (journalist at Moldova 1). Entries were assessed on criteria such as the melodic line, originality and interpretation of the composition.

Prior to the auditions, TRM announced that two songs were disqualified from the competition: "Squeeze Paradise" by Nördika due to it having been published before 1 September 2022, and "" by Massimo Sinceri  Da-Muse due to it violating the 50% foreign nationality rule. Dianna Rotaru, who entered under the stage name Lola, was due to compete with the song "", but was disqualified after she was unable to attend the live audition round.

Key:
 Selected for final
 Disqualified

Final 
The final took place on 4 March 2023. 10 songs competed and the winner was selected based on the combination of a public online vote and the votes of an expert jury. The jury that voted in the final included Gabriela Tocari (General Director of Capela Corală Moldova), Vlad Constandoi (founder of Senz Music), Leonid Melnic (Chief Deputy of Telefirm Chișinău), Viorica Atanasov (vocal coach, songwriter) and Gheorghe Mustea (professor at the Academy of Music, Theatre and Fine Arts). In addition to the performances of the competing entries, 2022 Moldovan Eurovision entrants Zdob și Zdub and Advahov Brothers,  Sudden Lights,  Theodor Andrei and the Moldovan National Symphony Orchestra performed as guests. 2023 Polish Eurovision entrant Blanka was also set to perform during the show as a guest, however, her flight to the event was cancelled.

At Eurovision 
According to Eurovision rules, all nations with the exceptions of the host country and the "Big Five" (France, Germany, Italy, Spain and the United Kingdom) are required to qualify from one of two semi-finals in order to compete for the final; the top 10 countries from each semi-final progress to the final. The European Broadcasting Union (EBU) split up the competing countries into six different pots based on voting patterns from previous contests, with countries with favourable voting histories put into the same pot. On 31 January 2023, an allocation draw was held, which placed each country into one of the two semi-finals, and determined which half of the show they would perform in. Moldova has been placed into the first semi-final, to be held on 9 May 2023, and has been scheduled to perform in the second half of the show.

Notes

References 

2023
Countries in the Eurovision Song Contest 2023